The Neftchi Baku 2017–18 season is Neftchi Baku's 26th Azerbaijan Premier League season. Neftchi will compete Azerbaijan Premier League and in the 2017–18 Azerbaijan Cup.

Season Events
On 21 August Elkhan Abdullayev resigned as the club's manager, with Elshad Ahmedov taking over in a caretaker role. On 11 September, Tarlan Ahmadov was announced as the club's new manager.

Squad

Out on loan

Transfers

Summer

In:

Out:

Winter

In:

Out:

Trial:

Friendlies

Competitions

Azerbaijan Premier League

Results summary

Results

League table

Azerbaijan Cup

Squad Statistics

Appearances and goals

|-
|colspan="14"|Players away on loan:

|-
|colspan="14"|Players who left Neftchi Baku during the season:

|}

Goal scorers

Disciplinary Record

References

External links 
 Official Website 

Neftçi PFK seasons
Azerbaijani football clubs 2017–18 season